The Martin Covered Bridge is a wooden covered bridge spanning the Winooski River off United States Route 2 in southern Marshfield, Vermont.  Built about 1890, it is the only surviving historic covered bridge in the town.  It was listed on the National Register of Historic Places in 1974.

Description and history
At one time the bridge carried a private farm road; it is now open only to pedestrians. It is covered by a gabled roof and its exterior is clad in vertical board siding. The siding does not rise all the way to the roof, and extends a shortway into the portals, sheltering the projecting upper ends. The abutments are made of roughly coursed dry laid stone. The trusses incorporate iron rods, which extend vertically from the bracing diagonals to the bottom chords.

The bridge was built about 1890 by Herman F. Townsend, a prominent local bridgewright.  It is one of the few surviving 19th century bridges in the state that was originally built on a private road, and is Marshfield's only surviving historic covered bridge.

See also
 
 
 
 
 List of covered bridges in Vermont
 National Register of Historic Places listings in Washington County, Vermont
 List of bridges on the National Register of Historic Places in Vermont

References

Covered bridges on the National Register of Historic Places in Vermont
National Register of Historic Places in Washington County, Vermont
Bridges completed in 1890
Covered bridges in Washington County, Vermont
Buildings and structures in Marshfield, Vermont
Wooden bridges in Vermont
Queen post truss bridges in the United States
Road bridges in Vermont